Villarreal Club de Futbol Juvenil are the under-19 team of Spanish professional football club Villarreal. 
They play in the Group VII of the División de Honor Juvenil de Fútbol where their main rivals are Valencia and Levante. 

They also participate in the national Copa de Campeones Juvenil and the Copa del Rey Juvenil, qualification for which is dependent on final league group position, and have taken part in the continental UEFA Youth League.

Juvenil A

Current squad

Season to season (Juvenil A)

División de Honor Juvenil de Fútbol
Seasons with two or more trophies shown in bold

Honours 
National competitions
 División de Honor (Gr. 7) (9): 2007–08, 2008–09, 2010–11, 2011–12, 2012–13, 2014–15, 2015–16, 2018–19, 2019–20
 Copa de Campeones (1): 2015 (runners-up: 2008, 2019)
 Copa del Rey Juvenil (1): 2019

See also
Villarreal CF B
Villarreal CF C

References

División de Honor Juvenil de Fútbol
Juvenil A
Football academies in Spain
UEFA Youth League teams